Operation Tinderbox was a series of 14 nuclear tests conducted by the United States in 1979–1980 at the Nevada Test Site. These tests followed the Operation Quicksilver series and preceded the Operation Guardian series.

List of the nuclear tests

References

Explosions in 1979
Explosions in 1980
1979 in military history
1980 in military history
Tinderbox